Tallula is an unincorporated community in Issaquena County, Mississippi, United States.

History
Tallula is a name derived from the Choctaw language purported to mean either (sources vary) "bell" or "to break off".

Tallula was the county seat from 1848 to 1871.

Notable person
Charles C. Diggs, Sr., the first African-American Democrat elected to the Michigan Senate, was born in Tallula.

References

Unincorporated communities in Issaquena County, Mississippi
Unincorporated communities in Mississippi
Mississippi populated places on the Mississippi River
Mississippi placenames of Native American origin